Craig Alexander Newmark (born December 6, 1952) is an American internet entrepreneur and philanthropist best known as the founder of the classifieds website Craigslist. Prior to founding Craigslist, he worked as a computer programmer for companies such as IBM, Bank of America, and Charles Schwab. Newmark served as chief executive officer of Craigslist from its founding until 2000. He founded Craig Newmark Philanthropies in 2015.

Early life and education
Newmark, the son of Joyce and Lee Newmark, was born to a Jewish family in 1952 in Morristown, New Jersey. As a child, Newmark liked science fiction and comic books, and wanted to become a paleontologist. Newmark's mother was a bookkeeper and his father was an insurance and meat salesman. When Newmark was thirteen, his father died from cancer. His mother then moved him and his younger brother, Jeff, to Jacob Ford Village.

As a teenager, Newmark attended Morristown High School, where he became interested in physics. He wore taped together, black-rimmed glasses and a pocket protector. In an interview, Newmark described his high school self as "possible nerd patient zero". During high school, he sang in the school choir, joined the physics club, co-captained the debate team, and was in the honor society. Newmark graduated high school in 1971.

During his freshman year of college, Newmark began studying computer science. He earned Bachelor of Science and Master of Science degrees in computing and information sciences from Case Western Reserve University in 1975 and 1977, respectively.

Career

Newmark is best known as the founder of Craigslist. Prior to establishing the website, he worked as a contract computer programmer for companies such as Bank of America, Sun Microsystems, and others. His first job out of college was with IBM, where he worked for 17 years as a programmer and systems engineer. During that time, he lived in Boca Raton, Florida, Detroit, and then Pittsburgh. He moved to San Francisco in 1993 after accepting a position with Charles Schwab. There, a coworker introduced him to the World Wide Web— which at the time was still relatively free of commercials.

In 1995, Newmark started emailing a list of upcoming events to a few friends to "cultivate a bit of community". Other people asked to be included on the list and as members grew, so did the kinds of information on the list. Newmark launched craigslist.org in 1996, as a place where people could exchange information, mostly without charge. He operated it as a hobby while continuing to work as a software engineer until 1999, when he incorporated Craigslist as a private for-profit company. In her book An Internet for the People: The Politics and Promise of craigslist, Jessa Lingel described the website as "the internet ungentrified". In 2000, Newmark stepped down as chief executive officer and handed off the role to Jim Buckmaster. Since then, Newmark has not been involved in the "day-to-day operations" of Craigslist. As of 2018, he continued to respond to Craigslist customer service inquiries, primarily dealing with spammers and scammers.

In 2005, Time magazine listed Craig Newmark as one of the 100 people shaping the world.

Newmark serves on the board of several non-profit organizations such as CUNY Graduate School of Journalism, Girls Who Code and Vets in Tech, among others. He also holds roles on the advisory boards of 18 other non-profits.

Philanthropy
As far back as 2004, Newmark was using his wealth to support philanthropic causes. In 2006, The Guardian reported that Newmark was "readying his armoury of cash to invest in citizen journalism projects". He also donated $20,000 to the non-profit NewAssignment.Net, a group attempting to combine the work of amateurs and professionals to produce investigative stories on the Internet. His philanthropic interests have also included environmental issues, as well as veterans affairs. He reportedly dubbed himself "Nerd-in-Residence" while consulting for the Center for Innovation of the Department of Veterans Affairs. In recent years, Newmark has directed his philanthropic efforts towards nonprofits working on journalism ethics and security, cybersecurity, and election integrity.

In 2011, Newmark launched , a non-profit initiative to support the efforts of other non-profits and public service organizations working in the areas of global poverty, the Middle East, veterans affairs, and low-income neighborhoods. In 2015, he founded , which acts as an umbrella for his other foundations, such as his private charitable foundation, to which he contributed $50 million in 2016 to support military families, voter registration efforts, and women in technology.

In January 2017, TechCrunch reported that Newmark donated $500,000 to Wikipedia's attempt at "reducing harassment and vandalism on the site and improve the tools moderators use every day to keep the peace".

Between 2016 and 2020, Newmark donated $170 million to support journalism, combating harassment of journalists, cybersecurity, and election integrity. Donations he made include: $1 million each to ProPublica and the Poynter Institute in 2017, $1 million to the Global Cyber Alliance, $150,000 to Women in CyberSecurity, $250,000 to PEN America, and $250,000 to the Girl Scouts for cybersecurity programs. In September 2018, he gave $20 million to fund the creation of The Markup, a non-profit news organization. In 2018, Newmark's donations totaled $143 million. That year, Newmark donated $1 million to 
Mother Jones to help the magazine combat fake news. In 2019, he donated $6 million to Consumer Reports to fund a Digital Lab focused on consumer privacy rights and digital security. Newmark made a $20 million endowment to the CUNY Graduate School of Journalism, which was subsequently renamed the Craig Newmark Graduate School of Journalism. According to The Chronicle of Philanthropy, Newmark's donations in 2020 included giving $1 million to the Anti-Defamation League, $388,000 to the American Press Institute, and $350,000 to the Feminist Majority Foundation and Ms. magazine. Bloomberg News reported that Newmark donated $10 million to charities focused on hunger issues in 2020, as well.

Newmark gave $5 million to the Poynter Institute, which used the funds to establish the Craig Newmark Center for Ethics and Leadership. Newmark's previous donation of $1 million to the Poynter established the Craig Newmark Journalism Ethics Chair. He also gave $10 million to Columbia University to establish a center for journalism ethics and security, as well as a professorship.

The Chronicle of Philanthropy ranked Newmark 17th out of 50 in its 2020 ranking of individual donors, giving a total of $100 million.

In 2021, Newmark's philanthropic efforts continued to address cybersecurity, misinformation, journalism, and food security. He supported the Institute for Security and Technology's anti-ransomware program; a six-month study on misinformation and disinformation by the Aspen Institute’s Commission on Information Disorder; the establishment of the Institute for Rebooting Social Media at Harvard University; the Reporters Without Borders Journalism Trust Initiative; and provided funding to expand PBS NewsHour's coverage of underrepresented communities. According to Newmark, as of May 2021 he'd given a total of $25 million to organizations working on food security, including $300,000 to the DC Central Kitchen.  

Newmark was among a group of prominent individuals who backed the Marshall Plan for Moms, which called on the Biden Administration to pass policies addressing paid family leave, training programs for women returning to work, and pay equity.

In 2022, Newmark's long-standing commitment to supporting digital securities continued, with $50 million worth of commitments. The pledges are in support of a broad coalition of organisation dedicated to educating, and protecting Americans from cybersecurity threats, providing measures to provide cybersecurity career opportunities, recommending and aid in development of cybersecurity tools, evolving the usability and service of cybersecurity tools and services and aiding big tech companies who contribute to equitable cybersecurity.

Other examples of organizations and causes Newmark has supported include: OneVoice, Sunlight Foundation, Voto Latino, the Center for Public Integrity, the Center for Investigative Reporting, PolitiFact, Poynter Institute, Columbia Journalism Review and Girls Who Code. The Center for Public Integrity, Columbia's Tow Center for Digital Journalism, Wikimedia Foundation, The Ground Truth Project, and the Berkeley Graduate School of Journalism and Berkeley Center for New Media. He has given $100,000 to support wildlife rescue groups. In 2015, he donated $10,000 to Grow It Green Morristown for the installation of a composting toilet at the Early Street Community Garden. The facility was named "Craig Newmark Memorial Latrine #2". The first toilet Newmark sponsored was in the City of Jericho.

Personal life
Newmark married Eileen Whelpley in December 2012, and they enjoy birding together. He currently lives in New York City. He flies commercial, does not own a car, and prefers using public transport.

Newmark describes himself as a non-practicing, secular Jew, joking that his rabbi was the late singer Leonard Cohen. He is also a fan of Tori Amos, Lou Reed, and the TV shows Pushing Daisies and The Simpsons.

Newmark's net worth is estimated to be in the hundreds of millions of dollars. In April 2020, Forbes estimated his net worth to be $1.3 billion but he has since dropped off its billionaires list. In an interview published by Nieman Lab in 2017, he called a prior $400 million Forbes estimate of his net worth "bogus" and said that "by monetizing Craigslist the way I did in 1999, I probably gave away already 90 percent or more of my potential net worth."

Newmark opposed the Iraq War and believed White House journalists “failed in their jobs” and did not "speak truth to power". In 2014, he was one of 60 Democratic Party donors who urged the creation of a system of public election funding. In 2016, Newmark joined with the progressive RAD Campaign and Lincoln Park Strategies to commission a poll examining user perceptions about social media conflicts during the 2016 election.

Newmark supported former President Barack Obama, volunteered for him on the campaign trail as "official technology surrogate", and praised Obama's use of technology to promote grassroots democracy. In the 2020 election, Newmark supported President Joseph Biden's campaign, citing Biden's "commitment to fighting corruption" and "record of standing up for our veterans".

References

Further reading

External links

 Craig Newmark Philanthropies

 craigblog, Craig Newmark's personal blog
 
 

1952 births
Living people
American bloggers
Case Western Reserve University alumni
People from Morristown, New Jersey
Businesspeople from San Francisco
Wikimedia Foundation Advisory Board members
Craigslist
Jewish American philanthropists
Morristown High School (Morristown, New Jersey) alumni
21st-century American Jews